Sportovní klub Slavia Praha, commonly known as Slavia Prague, is a Czech basketball club based in Prague. They will play in the 2022–23 National Basketball League (NBL), after promoting from the 1. Ligy in 2021–22.

Honours 
1. Ligy

 Champions (1): 2021–22

References

External links 

 Official website (in Czech)

Basketball teams in the Czech Republic
SK Slavia Prague